James Beach Wakefield (March 21, 1825 – August 25, 1910) was a United States Representative from Minnesota.

Wakefield was born in Winsted, Connecticut. He attended the public schools at Westfield, Massachusetts, and Jonesville, New York, graduated from Trinity College, Hartford, Connecticut, in 1846 and studied law in Painesville, Lake County, Ohio. He was admitted to the bar and commenced practice in Delphi, Indiana, in 1852. He moved to Shakopee, Minnesota, in 1854.  He was first judge of the probate court of Faribault County, Minnesota.

He was elected as a member of the Minnesota House of Representatives in 1858, 1863, and 1866, serving as speaker in the session of 1866.  He was elected as a member of the Minnesota State Senate 1867–1869.  He was appointed receiver of the United States Land Office at Winnebago City Township, Minnesota, June 1, 1869, and served until January 15, 1875, when he resigned. He was the eighth Lieutenant Governor of Minnesota 1875–1877. He was elected as a Republican to the 48th and 49th congresses, (March 4, 1883 – March 3, 1887).

He retired from public life and died at Blue Earth, Faribault County, Minnesota with interment in Evergreen Cemetery, Painesville, Ohio.

References

Minnesota Historical Society
Minnesota Legislators Past and Present

1825 births
1910 deaths
Republican Party Minnesota state senators
Lieutenant Governors of Minnesota
Speakers of the Minnesota House of Representatives
Minnesota state court judges
People from Winsted, Connecticut
People from Painesville, Ohio
Republican Party members of the United States House of Representatives from Minnesota
19th-century American politicians
People from Blue Earth, Minnesota
People from Shakopee, Minnesota
People from Winnebago, Minnesota
19th-century American judges